With Hindenburg for a national Prussia (United Patriotic Leagues and Associations) was a candidature for the 1933 election to the Prussian Landtag. The candidature belonged to the same electoral bloc as the NSDAP. The candidature got 206,919 votes (0.87% of the Prussian vote) but no seats in the Landtag.

References

Defunct political parties in Germany
Nazi Party
Political parties in the Weimar Republic